The Walker–Klinner Farm is a historic  farm and historic district near Maplesville, Chilton County, Alabama.  The present boundaries of the farm were established during the mid-1850s.  The two-and-a-half-story Eastlake-style farmhouse was built in 1890.  Other contributing structures include the front yard fence (1927), tool shed (1900), chicken house (1900), corn crib (1890), overseer's house (1930), 4 tenant houses (ranging from 1850 to 1910), shed (1900), 3 barns (ranging from 1870 to 1900), water pump (1900), chicken coop (1900), cemetery (19th century), store (late 19th century), and a dogtrot house (19th century).  There are also 15 noncontributing structures on the property.  The farm is significant for its intact mid-19th century farm boundaries and for being maintained as a farm for more than 135 years at the time of nomination to the National Register.  It was added to the National Register of Historic Places on October 15, 1987.

References

National Register of Historic Places in Chilton County, Alabama
Victorian architecture in Alabama
Houses completed in 1890
Houses on the National Register of Historic Places in Alabama
Historic districts in Chilton County, Alabama
Houses in Chilton County, Alabama
Historic districts on the National Register of Historic Places in Alabama
Farms on the National Register of Historic Places in Alabama